Sekou Sylla may refer to:

Sekou Sylla (footballer, born 1992), Guinean football forward for Churchill Brothers
Sekou Sylla (footballer, born 1999), Guinean football left-back for Cambuur